W8 or W-8 may be:
 W8, a postcode district in the W postcode area
 W8 engine, an eight-cylinder piston engine in a W configuration
 Cargojet, IATA airline designator
 Worms 3D, the eighth game in the Worms series
 Vector W8, a sports car produced by Vector Aeromotive
 London bus W8, a London bus route
 a specific size of I-beam
 Windows 8, an operating system
 W8 (loading gauge) on the British rail system
 W8 (tram), a class of electric trams modified by Yarra Trams from SW6, W6 and W7 trams.
 Form W-8, a series of IRS tax forms

See also 
 Wait
 Weight

de:Liste von Abkürzungen (Netzjargon)#W